Kapil Singh Lalwani (born 1 November 1990) is an Indian actor who appears in TV serials like Kundali Bhagya and Bade Achhe Lagte Hain. He is famous for playing Hirnasur in 2017 TV series Chandrakanta. Lalwani has also worked in Rajinikanth's film Darbar.

Television

Filmography

References

External links
 

1990 births
Indian male television actors
Living people
Indian male actors
Male actors from Mumbai
Actors from Mumbai
21st-century Indian actors